Ritualism, in the history of Christianity, refers to an emphasis on the rituals and liturgical ceremonies of the church. Specifically, the Christian practice of Holy Communion.

In the Anglican church in the 19th century, the role of ritual became a contentious matter. The debate over this topic was also associated with struggles between High Church and Low Church movements.

Definition
In Anglicanism, the term 'ritualist' is often used to describe the revival of second generation Oxford Movement/Anglo-Catholic/High Church which sought to reintroduce a range of Roman Catholic liturgical practices to the Church of England. Ritualism is also seen as a controversial term (i.e. rejected by some of those to whom it is applied).

Common arguments
Arguments about ritualism in the Church of England were often shaped by opposing (and often unannounced) attitudes towards the concept of sola scriptura and the nature of the authority of the Bible for Christians.

For
Those who support the ritualist outlook in the Church of England have often argued that the adoption of key elements of Roman Catholic ritual:
 Give liturgical expression to the ecclesiological belief that the Church of England is more Catholic than Protestant;
 Give liturgical expression to a belief in the Real Presence and concomitantly that the Eucharist is the most important act of church worship and should be the norm;
 Are the most effective vehicle for giving expression to the worship of heaven as described in the Book of Revelation in which the use of white robes and incense in a setting of considerable beauty is described;
 Are a liturgical expression of the story in the book of Gospel of Matthew of the response of the Magi to the birth of Jesus who brought the gifts of gold, frankincense and myrrh as an act of adoration;
 Enables worshippers to use all of their senses in order to worship – worship with the whole person, not just the mind;
 Is "incarnational" – by placing emphasis on liturgical action and physical objects, it draws attention to the importance that Christians should attach to the fact that they believe that, in Jesus, "the Word became flesh": those things are part of what God makes and saves, and not repudiated by Him;
 Are the most effective form of worship for cultures that are either highly visual or in which literacy rates are low;
 Are an expression of the human response to God that calls on humans to offer their best in worship – a way of expressing the value ("worth") that they place on God : worship is, etymologically, "worth-ship".

Against

Those who oppose ritualism in the Church of England have generally argued that it:
 encourages idolatry in that it encourages worshippers to focus on ritual objects and actions rather than the things they are meant to symbolize;
 constitutes an attempt to wrest the Church of England from its Protestant identity;
 constitutes a downgrading of the significance of preaching and biblical exposition in regular Christian worship;
 encourages an idolatrous attitude to the Eucharist because ritualism is predicated on a belief in the Real Presence;
 uses excessive elaborations in worship that cannot be justified on the basis of the descriptions of worship in the Gospels, the Acts of the Apostles, or the Epistles in the New Testament – the robes used in the worship of heaven described in the Book of Revelation are plain white;
 undermines a key Protestant belief that no human actions, even worship precisely and carefully offered, can be of any value when it comes to being justified in the eyes of God: worship should be an unfussy, obedient, penitent, grateful, and spontaneously joyful response to the experience of being saved by faith alone in Jesus – ritual and tradition are merely human inventions;
 has often impeded the understanding of the gospel by wrapping up Christian worship in indecipherable symbolic acts;
 is not beautiful as proponents claim but rather gaudy and distracting from contemplative worship.

Ritualist controversies in the 19th century

Origins

The development of ritualism in the Church of England was mainly associated with what is commonly called "second generation" Anglo-Catholicism, i.e. the Oxford Movement as it developed after 1845 when John Henry Newman abandoned the Church of England to become a Roman Catholic. Some scholars argued that it was almost inevitable that some of the leaders of Anglo-Catholicism would turn their attentions to questions of liturgy and ritual and started to champion the use of practices and forms of worship more commonly associated with Roman Catholicism. However, there was only limited enthusiasm amongst ritualists to introduce the widespread use of Latin in the liturgy, which was the norm in the Roman Catholic Church before Vatican II.

The leaders of the first generation of the Anglo-Catholic revival or Oxford Movement (e.g. Newman, Edward Bouverie Pusey, and John Keble) had been primarily concerned with theological and ecclesiological questions and had little concern with questions of ritual. They championed the view that the fundamental identity of the Church of England was Catholic rather than Protestant.  They had argued that Anglicans were bound by obedience to the use of the Book of Common Prayer. "Tract 3" of the Tracts for the Times series had strenuously argued against any revision of the Book of Common Prayer, viewing its use as a matter of absolute obligation. Even Tract 90, which analyzed the 39 Articles, was more concerned with the theological dimension of the issue. It gave little attention to the question of altering current liturgical practice in the Church of England.

The ecclesiological questions gave rise to an interest in giving liturgical expression to the theological conviction that the Church of England had sustained a fundamentally Catholic character after the English Reformation. In some circles, the shift of focus to the question of liturgy proved as provocative as had been the theological assertions of the first generation of Anglo-Catholicism.

The clearest illustration of the shift that took place within Anglo-Catholicism from theological to liturgical questions is to be found in Pusey's attitude towards ritualism. Pusey, the only pre-eminent first-generation leader of Anglo-Catholicism to survive into the second generation, had no sympathy with the preoccupation with ritual. However, when priests started to be prosecuted and imprisoned as a result of the Public Worship Regulation Act 1874, Pusey was quick to show his support for those who were prosecuted.

Early controversies in the 19th century

"Bells and smells": the controversial ritual practices
From the 1850s to the 1890s, several liturgical practices espoused by many ritualists led to some occasional and intense local controversies – some leading to prosecutions (most notably as a result of the Public Worship Regulation Act 1874). Those considered most important by adherents of the Catholic movement were known as the "six points":
 the use of Eucharistic vestments such as the chasuble, stole, alb and maniple
 the use of a thurible and incense
 the use of "lights" (especially the practice of putting six candles on the high altar)
 the use of unleavened (wafer) bread in communion
 eastward facing celebration of the Eucharist (when the priest celebrates facing the altar from the same side as the people, i.e. the priest faces east with the people, instead of standing at the "north side" of the "table" placed in the chancel or body of the church, as required by the 1662 Book of Common Prayer)
 the mixing of sacramental wine with water

Other contentious practices included:
 the use of Catholic terminology such as describing the Eucharist as the "Mass"
 the use of bells at the elevation of the host
 making the sign of the cross
 the use of liturgical processions
 the decoration of churches with statues of saints, pictures of religious scenes and icons
 the veneration of the Blessed Virgin Mary and the practice of the invocation of the saints
 the practice of Benediction of the Blessed Sacrament
 the use of the words of Benedictus at the end of the Sanctus in the eucharistic prayer
 the use of the words of the Agnus Dei in the Eucharist

With regard to the "north side" celebration: at the time of the Reformation, altars were fixed against the east end of the church, and the priests would celebrate the Mass standing at the front of the altar.  Beginning with the rubrics of the Second Prayer Book of Edward VI published in 1552, and through the 1662 Book of Common Prayer (which prevailed for almost 300 years), the priest is directed to stand "at the north syde of the Table."  This was variously interpreted over the years to mean the north side of the front of a fixed communion table, the north end of a fixed table (i.e., facing south), the north side of a free-standing table (presumably facing those intending to receive the Elements who would be sitting in the quire stalls opposite), or at the north  end of a free-standing table lengthwise in the chancel, facing a congregation seated in the nave. If the last option then it would copy the practice of the Early Church when the celebrant stood before a small stone or marble table, usually rectangular, facing the nave.

The ritualist movement (see Cambridge Camden Society) also played a substantial role in promoting:
 the restoration of chancels in parish churches
 the use of robed choirs seated in the chancel accompanied by pipe organ rather than by a Church band and seated in a west gallery at the back of the church.

The prosecution and conviction of Arthur Tooth in 1876, Sidney Faithorn Green in 1879 and Richard William Enraght in 1880 are good illustrative examples of the kind of issues that could be involved in controversies caused by these liturgical practices. The prosecutions (which were often instigated by the Church Association) gave considerable impetus to the foundation and work of the English Church Union. The Society of the Holy Cross (SSC) played a crucial role in championing and developing the use of elements of proscribed Catholic ritual in Anglicanism.

Perception of ritualism as a threat to English identity
For many who opposed ritualism, the key concern was to defend what they saw as the fundamentally Protestant identity of the Church of England. Nor was this just a matter of an ecclesiological argument: for many, there was a sense that Catholic worship is somehow "un-English". Catholicism was deeply associated in many minds with cultural identities which, historically, many English people had commonly treated with suspicion, especially the Spanish, the French, and the Irish.

For an ideological defense of this position, it was argued that English identity was closely tied in with England's history as a Protestant country that, after the Reformation, had played a key role in opposing Catholic powers in Continental Europe (especially Spain and then France). In the minds of such people, Protestantism was inextricably identified with anti-despotic values and Catholicism with autocracy that, in the religious arena, hid behind the "disguise" of such things as complicated rituals whose meaning deliberately lacked transparency. The opposition to ritualism therefore had a deeply cultural and symbolic significance that extended far beyond purely theological concerns.

Ritualists themselves were often at pains to try and present the "Englishness" of the ritual they championed by (mostly) keeping English as the language of the liturgy and reconstructing Anglo-Catholicism as a recovery of pre-Reformation Catholic forms that were specifically English: a revival of interest in the Sarum Rite (the pre-Reformation Catholic liturgy of Salisbury) was sparked off by the Ritualist movement. This tendency was also often expressed in such details as the revival in the use of the pre-Reformation Gothic forms rather than the Baroque – the Baroque was more closely linked in the minds of many with specifically continental and Counter Reformation forms.

Ritualism and Christian socialism
Although ritualism had an aesthetic and ideological appeal for many in the cultural elite, and had a cognate relationship with the Gothic Revival, the idea that it was inextricably linked with an inclination towards political despotism was a misapprehension. Ritualism had an appeal for many who were politically conservative and had supporters highly placed in the establishment (e.g. Viscount Halifax and the 4th Marquess of Bath). However, the outlook of many of the ritualist clergy themselves, many of whom inevitably operated in some of the most deprived communities in England, resulted in their becoming politically radicalized by the experience – some became ardent Christian socialists.

Anti-ritualism and "muscular Christianity"
In the spectrum of hostility that it aroused, ritualism also provoked in some of its opponents a reaction that saw its theatricality and its aestheticism as symptoms of "effeminacy". A typical charge was that ritualistic clergy were "man milliners", more concerned with lace and brocade than doctrine. Adverse reaction to this played a significant role in the evolution of the Broad and Low Church enthusiasm for "muscular Christianity".

Ritualism and outreach to the unchurched urban poor
One of the key ideological justifications used by many of the early ritualists, apart from the fact that it was a symbolic way of affirming their belief in the essentially Catholic nature of Anglicanism, was the argument that it provided a particularly effective medium for bringing Christianity to the poorest, "slum parishes" of the Church of England.

It was argued that ritual and aesthetically impressive liturgy did not only provide a powerful contrast to the drabness of the lives of the poor, its emphasis on symbol and action rather than word was a more effective medium for spreading Christian faith in areas with poor literacy rates than the highly cerebral and logocentric worship that was focused on the Book of Common Prayer. This argument may have had some merits, but, very often, the respect that the most successful ritualists often gained in the highly impoverished communities they went to serve was based on the fact that they had expressed a genuine pastoral concern for the poor amongst whom they lived.

The argument for ritualism in Anglicanism was also based on the analogy of the success of the Roman Catholic Church amongst the highly impoverished Irish migrant communities in the urban areas of England – it was argued by some that ritual played a key role in the growth of the Roman Catholic Church amongst the poor. However, the use of ritual probably played little more than a subsidiary role in the success of the Catholic Church in this area: its success was probably largely due to a special cultural identity that many Irish migrants felt with the Roman Catholic Church as one of the few institutions that they encountered in diaspora that was also a feature of life in their homeland.

Legacy of the controversies
The ritualists' use of vestments and wafer bread have become widespread, even normative, in the Church of England for much of the 20th century.

Although many members of the Church of England today still feel uncomfortable or skeptical about certain 'Catholic' or 'Romish'  liturgical practices, they would be astonished to be told that, in the late 19th century, using incense, wearing vestments, putting candles on the altar, the mixed cup, making the sign of the Cross over the congregation, and using unleavened (wafer) bread in the Eucharist could spark riots, put priests in prison and even led in 1888–90 to the prosecution of a bishop – Edward King, Bishop of Lincoln. The lasting legacy is that the Ritualists won: the current liturgical style in its various manifestations in almost all Anglican parishes world-wide is much closer to the way Mass was celebrated 500 years ago even in Low Church and 'mid-range' parishes.

See also

References

Bibliography

 James Bentley: Ritualism and Politics in Victorian Britain: Oxford: Oxford University Press, 1978: 
 Lida Ellsworth: Charles Lowder and the Ritualist Movement: London: Darton, Longman and Todd, 1982: 
 Gary Graber: Ritual Legislation in the Victorian Church of England: Antecedents and Passage of the Public Worship Regulation Act 1874: San Francisco: Mellen Research University Press, 1993: 
 David Hilliard: " UnEnglish and Unmanly: Anglo-Catholicism and Homosexuality": Victorian Studies: (Winter 1982): 181–210.
 Kenneth Hylson-Smith: High Churchmanship in the Church of England: From the Sixteenth to the Late Twentieth Centuries: Edinburgh: T&T Clark, 1993: 
 John Shelton Reed: Glorious Battle: The Cultural Politics of Victorian Anglo-Catholicism: Nashville & London: Vanderbilt University Press, 1996: 
 Frank Reynolds: Martyr of Ritualism: Father MacKonochie of St Alban's, Holborn: London: Faber and Faber, 1965.
 Martin Wellings, Evangelicals Embattled: Responses of Evangelicals in the Church of England to Ritualism, Darwinism and Theological Liberalism (1890–1930): Carlisle: Paternoster Press, 2003: 
 James Whisenant: A Fragile Unity: Anti-Ritualism and the Division of Anglican Evangelicalism in the Nineteenth Century: Carlisle: Paternoster Press, 2003: 
 Nigel Yates: Anglican Ritualism in Victorian Britain: (1830–1910).  Oxford: Oxford University Press, 1999:

External links
 Project Canterbury: Ritualism
 A contemporary view of the Ritualist controversies from one of its qualified supporters: Archdeacon Denison
 "Scarfs or Stoles?" - An Evangelical Anglican critique of the use of vestments
 "The Teaching of the Ritualists not the Teaching of the Church of England", by John Charles Ryle critical of Ritualism
 

Anglo-Catholicism
Ritual
Anglicanism
Cultural conventions
History of the Church of England
Sacraments